General Maynard is a municipality located in the Brazilian state of Sergipe. Its population was 3,384 (2020) and its area is 20 km².

References

Populated places established in 1963
Municipalities in Sergipe